Jack Stanley Watling (13 January 1923 – 22 May 2001) was an English actor.

Life and career
The son of a travelling scrap metal dealer, Watling trained at the Italia Conti Academy of Theatre Arts as a child; and made his stage debut in Where the Rainbow Ends at the Holborn Empire in 1936. He made his first film appearances (all uncredited) in Sixty Glorious Years, Housemaster (both 1938) and Goodbye, Mr Chips (1939).

In 1941, he played Bill Hopkins in Once a Crook in his West End debut. He starred as Flight Lieutenant Teddy Graham in the original 1942 production of Terence Rattigan's Flare Path.

Watling had a long career in low-key British films, originally in easy-going boyish roles. His early appearances were in Cottage to Let (1941). We Dive at Dawn (1943), The Demi-Paradise (1943) opposite Laurence Olivier, The Way Ahead (1944) with David Niven, The Winslow Boy (1948), Meet Mr. Lucifer (1953) and in Orson Welles' Mr. Arkadin (aka, Confidential Report, 1955). In the account of the sinking of the Titantic, the film A Night To Remember (1958), he played Fourth Officer Joseph Boxhall and in Sink the Bismarck! (1960) as the Signals officer who reports "HMS Hood...has blown up!"

Television
His reputation as an effective and reliable television actor took root in the early 1960s.  Between 1964–69 he was Don Henderson, the troubled conscience to tough businessman John Wilder (Patrick Wymark) in The Plane Makers and its sequel The Power Game. Watling also appeared as Doc Saxon in the 1970s series Pathfinders. He played Professor Edward Travers in the BBC science-fiction television series Doctor Who in the serials The Abominable Snowmen (1967) and The Web of Fear (1968), both of which also featuring his daughter Deborah Watling as the Second Doctor's companion Victoria Waterfield. He reprised the role decades later in the independent Doctor Who spin-off video Downtime (1995). He also took over the role of Arthur Bourne in the final series of The Cedar Tree in 1979

His final roles were all on television, in series such as Bergerac 4 episodes 1989-1991 as Frank Blakemore and Heartbeat as The Colonel 1994 in Lost and Found.

Personal life
Watling was married to former actress Patricia Hicks. He was the father of actress Deborah Watling, actor/politician Giles Watling, sculptor Nicky Matthews, and a fourth child, Adam, who died in infancy. Watling was also the stepfather of actress Dilys Watling, Hicks's daughter from a previous marriage. The Watlings were long-term residents at Alderton Hall, Loughton.

Selected filmography

 Sixty Glorious Years (1938) – Minor Role (uncredited)
 The Day Will Dawn (1942) – Lieutenant (uncredited)
 Flying Fortress (1942) – Rear Gunner (uncredited)
 The Young Mr. Pitt (1942) – Atkinson (uncredited)
 We Dive at Dawn (1943) – Navigating Officer – Lt. Gordon, R.N.
 The Demi-Paradise (1943) – Tom
 The Way Ahead (1944) – Buster – Marjorie's boyfriend
 Journey Together (1945) – John Aynesworth
 The Courtneys of Curzon Street (1947) – Teddy Courtney
 Easy Money (1948) – Dennis Stafford
 Quartet (1948) – Nicky (segment "The Facts of Life")
 The Winslow Boy (1948) – Dickie Winslow
 Under Capricorn (1949) – Winter
 Once a Sinner (1950) – John Ross
 The Naked Heart (1950) – Robert Gagnon
 White Corridors (1951) – Dick Groom
 Private Information (1952) – Hugh
 Father's Doing Fine (1952) – Clifford Magill
 Flannelfoot (1953) – Frank Mitchell
 Meet Mr. Lucifer (1953) – Jim
 Stryker of the Yard (1953) – Tony Ashworth
 Dangerous Cargo (1954) – Tim Matthews
 Trouble in the Glen (1954) – Sammy Weller
 The Golden Link (1954) – Bill Howard
 The Sea Shall Not Have Them (1954) – Flying Officer Harding
 Tale of Three Women (1954) – Dick (segment "Thief of London" story)
 Mr. Arkadin (1955) – Marquis of Rutleigh
 A Time to Kill (1955) – Dennis Willows
 Windfall (1955) – John Lee
 Reach for the Sky (1956) – Peel
 That Woman Opposite (1957) – Toby Lawes
 The Admirable Crichton (1957) – Treherne
 The Birthday Present (1957) – Bill Thompson
 Gideon's Day (1958) – Reverend Small
 A Night to Remember (1958) – Fourth Officer Joseph Boxhall
 Chain of Events (1958) – Freddie
 Links of Justice (1958) – Edgar Mills
 The Solitary Child (1958) – Cyril
 Sink the Bismarck! (1960) – Signals Officer
 Nearly a Nasty Accident (1961) – Flight Lt. Grogan
 Three on a Spree (1961) – Michael Brewster
 Mary Had a Little... (1961) – Scott Raymond
 Nothing Barred (1961) – Peter Brewster
 The Queen's Guards (1961) – Capt. Shergold
 Never Back Losers (1961)
 Flat Two (Edgar Wallace Mysteries) (1962) – Frank Leamington
 Who Was Maddox? (Edgar Wallace Mysteries)  (1964) – Jack Heath
 The Nanny (1965) – Dr. Medman
 Follow Me! (1972) – Wealthy Client (uncredited)
 The Adventures of Barry McKenzie (1972) – TV Director
 Father, Dear Father (1973) – Bill Mossman
 11 Harrowhouse (1974) – Fitzmaurice
  The Cedar Tree (1978-9) - Captain Palmer, and then Cdr. Bourne
 Slip-Up (1986, TV film) – Champion

References

External links
 
 

1923 births
2001 deaths
Deaths from cancer in England
English male television actors
English male film actors
People from Chingford
20th-century English male actors
Male actors from Essex
Alumni of the Italia Conti Academy of Theatre Arts
English male stage actors